This is the complete list of Pan American Games medalists in karate from 1995 to 2015.

Men's events

Kata

Kumite (– 60 kg)

Kumite (– 62 kg)

Kumite (– 65 kg)

Kumite (– 66 kg)

Kumite (– 67 kg)

Kumite (– 68 kg)

Kumite (– 70 kg)

Kumite (– 72 kg)

Kumite (– 74 kg)

Kumite (– 75 kg)

Kumite (– 80 kg)

Kumite (+ 80 kg)

Kumite (– 84 kg)

Kumite (+84 kg)

Kumite (Open Class)

Kumite (Team)

Women's events

Kata

Kumite (– 50 kg)

Kumite (– 53 kg)

Kumite (+ 53 kg)

Kumite (– 55 kg)

Kumite (– 58 kg)

Kumite (+ 58 kg)

Kumite (– 60 kg)

Kumite (+ 60 kg)

Kumite (– 61 kg)

Kumite (– 68 kg)

Kumite (+ 68 kg)

Kumite (Team)

References

Karate